Gert Claessens (born 21 February 1972 in Tongeren) is a Belgian retired professional footballer who played as a midfielder.

References

External links
 

1972 births
Living people
People from Tongeren
Belgian footballers
Association football midfielders
Belgium international footballers
RFC Liège players
K.R.C. Genk players
Club Brugge KV players
Lierse S.K. players
Real Oviedo players
SBV Vitesse players
Belgian expatriate footballers
Belgian expatriate sportspeople in Spain
Expatriate footballers in Spain
Belgian expatriate sportspeople in the Netherlands
Expatriate footballers in the Netherlands
Footballers from Limburg (Belgium)